Thomas Christopher Platt (born 1 October 1993) is an English semi-professional footballer who plays as a midfielder for Boston United.

Platt started his career with York City, progressing through the club's youth system before signing a professional contract in June 2012. He had loan spells with Hucknall Town, Harrogate Town and FC Halifax Town before making his first-team debut with York in March 2013. He rejoined Harrogate on loan in August 2015 and signed for the club permanently in March 2016. Platt was released by Harrogate after the 2016–17 season.

Career

York City

Born in Pontefract, West Yorkshire, Platt attended Easingwold School and played for Easingwold Town before joining the York City youth system in 2004. He joined Northern Premier League Division One South club Hucknall Town on loan in October 2011, making his only appearance as a substitute against Stamford before returning to York in November. Later in the 2011–12 season, Platt signed for Harrogate Town of the Conference North on loan on 6 March 2012, scoring on his debut later that day with Harrogate's first goal in a 6–2 home win over Corby Town. He finished the loan with two goals in 10 appearances. Following the end of the season he was named York's Youth Team Player of the Year, having captained the under-18 team during the season.

Platt signed a one-year professional contract with York in June 2012, following their promotion to League Two via the Conference Premier play-offs, with manager Gary Mills saying "I have high hopes for him. He's done superbly well. I think he's got a bright future." He rejoined Harrogate on a three-month loan on 27 September 2012, making his second debut for the club two days later in a 2–2 draw at Worcester City. He played in five FA Cup matches for Harrogate, including their matches against Conference Premier team Hyde in the fourth qualifying round and League Two team Torquay United in the first round. He scored in the second round against Hastings United in a 1–1 draw, and scored a 90th-minute equaliser in the replay, although Harrogate lost 5–4 in a penalty shoot-out after a 1–1 extra-time draw. He scored eight goals in 11 appearances before returning to York in December 2012.

Platt signed for another Conference North club, FC Halifax Town, on a one-month loan on 17 January 2013. His debut came in a 5–1 win at Corby Town on 2 February 2013. Having made three appearances for Halifax he returned to Harrogate on 22 February 2013, signing on loan for the rest of 2012–13. Platt marked his return with Harrogate's opening goal in a 2–0 win away to Gloucester City on 23 February 2013.

He was recalled by newly appointed York manager Nigel Worthington on 21 March 2013, having scored three goals in six matches during his third spell with Harrogate. He made his York debut in a 2–1 defeat away to Torquay on 23 March 2013, entering the match as a half-time substitute for Paddy McLaughlin. He then started York's six remaining matches, being paired alongside Adam Reed in midfield, as York went on to avoid relegation on the final day of the 2012–13. Platt's emergence in the team was praised by Worthington as the "biggest highlight" of York's relegation battle, and having finished his first senior season at York with seven appearances signed a new two-year contract with the club in May 2013.

Harrogate Town
Platt rejoined National League North club Harrogate on a three-month loan on 28 August 2015, and made his debut a day later as a 55th-minute substitute for Paul Thirlwell in a 1–0 away win over Chorley. He made six appearances for Harrogate before being recalled by York on 28 September 2015 after an injury to Luke Summerfield. Platt returned to Harrogate on a one-month loan on 27 January 2016, debuting three days later as a 69th-minute substitute for Brendon Daniels in a 4–3 away defeat to F.C. United of Manchester. Platt joined Harrogate permanently on 24 March 2016, after his contract with York was terminated by mutual consent. At the end of 2016–17, Platt was released by Harrogate.

Alfreton Town
On 16 June 2017, Platt signed for National League North club Alfreton Town on a one-year contract.

Boston United
On 15 May 2019, Platt joined Boston United.

Playing positions
Platt primarily plays as a central midfielder, but can also play at centre-back.

Career statistics

References

External links

Profile at the Alfreton Town F.C. website

1993 births
Living people
Sportspeople from Pontefract
Footballers from West Yorkshire
English footballers
Association football midfielders
York City F.C. players
Hucknall Town F.C. players
Harrogate Town A.F.C. players
FC Halifax Town players
Alfreton Town F.C. players
Boston United F.C. players
Northern Premier League players
National League (English football) players
English Football League players